Alipur may refer to the following places:

Bangladesh
 Alipur, Jhalokati

 Alipur, Netrokona

India 
 Alipur, Bihar
 Alipur, Chanditala-I
 Alipur, Delhi
 Alipur, Jaynagar
 Alipur, Karnataka

 Alipur, Kapurthala
 Alipur, Ludhiana
 Alipur, Malda
 Alipur, Raebareli, a village in Uttar Pradesh, India
 Alipur, Purba Bardhaman
 Alipore, South Kolkata
 Alipore, Navsari
 Alipur ullar, Bihar

Pakistan 
 Alipur Chatha, Gujranwala District
 Alipur (Muzaffargarh)
 Alipur Tehsil

 Alipur Farash

See also
 Alipurduar, West Bengal, India